Estevan "Steve" García Júnior (born May 22, 1992) is an American mixed martial artist currently competing in the Lightweight division of Ultimate Fighting Championship. Garcia competed in Bellator's bantamweight division.

Background
Inspired by his friends, Garcia initially started training mixed martial arts at Greg Jackson's satellite gym at the age of 15. He then went on to train jiu-jitsu and kickboxing at Luttrell's MMA before moving to Jackson-Wink MMA.

Mixed martial arts career

Bellator MMA
Garcia was expected to make his Bellator debut against Shawn Bunch at Bellator 97 on July 31, 2013. However, Garcia pulled out of the fight due to injury and was replaced by Russell Wilson.

The bout with Shawn Bunch was rescheduled for Bellator 105 on October 25, 2013. Garcia defeated Bunch via TKO in the third round.

After signing a new deal with the promotion, Garcia faced Cody Walker at Bellator 121 on June 6, 2014. He won the fight via KO just 39 seconds into the first round.

Garcia faced Kin Moy at Bellator 123 on September 5, 2014. Garcia won the fight via split decision.

Garcia faced Eduardo Bustillos at Bellator 143 on September 25, 2015. He won the fight via TKO in the first round.

Garcia faced Ricky Turcios at Bellator 151 on March 4, 2016. He lost the fight via split decision; the first loss of his professional MMA career.

Garcia faced Ronnie Lawrence at Bellator 162 at October 21, 2016. He won the fight via unanimous decision.

Garcia was expected to face Joe Taimanglo at Bellator 174 on March 3, 2017. However, the bout was removed from the fight card after Taimanglo missed weight.

Garcia faced veteran Joe Warren at Bellator 181 on July 14, 2017. He lost the fight by unanimous decision.

On February 20, 2018 it was announced that Bellator had released Garcia from the promotion.

Contender Series
Garcia competed on Dana White's Contender Series 25 in August 2019. While he defeated Desmond Torres via TKO in the first round, he was not awarded a UFC contract.

Legacy Fighting Alliance
After the Contender Series, Garcia fought for Legacy Fighting Alliance. He defeated Jose Mariscal via TKO in the second round.

Ultimate Fighting Championship
Garcia made his promotional debut against Luis Peña, replacing Alex Muñoz on February 29, 2020 at UFC Fight Night 169. He lost the fight via unanimous decision.

Garcia was scheduled to face Peter Barrett on August 8, 2020 at UFC Fight Night 174. However, on July 25, 2020 Gracia withdrew from the bout for undisclosed reason and he was replaced by Youssef Zalal.

Garcia was scheduled to face Charles Jourdain on March 13, 2021 at UFC Fight Night 187. However, Garcia withdrew from the fight for unknown reasons and was replaced by Marcelo Rojo.

Gracia faced Charlie Ontiveros  on October 9, 2021 at UFC Fight Night 194. He won the bout via second round technical knockout.

Garcia was scheduled to face Damir Hadžović on April 23, 2022 at UFC Fight Night 205. The was scrapped after visa issues on the part of Damir.

Garcia faced Hayisaer Maheshate on June 11, 2022 at UFC 275. He lost the bout after getting knocked out in the first round.

Garcia faced Chase Hooper on October 29, 2022 at UFC Fight Night 213. He won the fight via TKO in the first round.

Garcia is scheduled to face Shayilan Nuerdanbieke April 8, 2023, at UFC 287.

Mixed martial arts record

|-
|Win
|align=center|13–5
|Chase Hooper
|TKO (punches)
|UFC Fight Night: Kattar vs. Allen
|
|align=center|1
|align=center|1:32
|Las Vegas, Nevada, United States
|
|-
|Loss
|align=center|12–5
|Hayisaer Maheshate
|KO (punch)
|UFC 275
|
|align=center|1
|align=center|1:14
|Kallang, Singapore
|
|-
|Win
|align=center|12–4
|Charlie Ontiveros
|TKO (punches)
|UFC Fight Night: Dern vs. Rodriguez
|
|align=center|2
|align=center|1:51
|Las Vegas, Nevada, United States
|
|-
|Loss
|align=center|11–4
|Luis Peña
|Decision (unanimous)
|UFC Fight Night: Benavidez vs. Figueiredo
|
|align=center|3
|align=center|5:00
|Norfolk, Virginia, United States
|
|-
|Win
|align=center| 11–3
|Jose Mariscal
|TKO (punches)
|LFA 80
|
|align=center| 2
|align=center| 2:27
|Albuquerque, New Mexico, United States
|
|-
|Win
|align=center| 10–3
|Desmond Torres
|TKO (punches)
|Dana White's Contender Series 25
|
|align=center| 1
|align=center| 4:35
|Las Vegas, Nevada, United States
|
|-
|Win
|align=center|9–3
|Andrew Whitney
|TKO (punches)
|JacksonWink Fight Night 5
|
|align=center|1
|align=center|3:27
|Albuquerque, New Mexico, United States
|
|-
|Win
|align=center|8–3
|Abel Cullum
|Decision (unanimous)
|JacksonWink Fight Night 4
|
|align=center|3
|align=center|5:00
|Albuquerque, New Mexico, United States
|
|-
|Loss
|align=center|7–3
|Aalon Cruz
|Submission (rear-naked choke)
|JacksonWink Fight Night 3
|
|align=center|1
|align=center|1:47
|Albuquerque, New Mexico, United States
|
|-
|Loss
|align=center|7–2
|Joe Warren
|Decision (unanimous)
|Bellator 181
|
|align=center|3
|align=center|5:00
|Thackerville, Oklahoma, United States 
|
|-
|Win
|align=center|7–1
|Ronnie Lawrence
|Decision (unanimous)
|Bellator 162
|
|align=center|3
|align=center|5:00
|Memphis, Tennessee, United States 
|
|-
|Loss
|align=center|6–1
|Ricky Turcios
|Decision (split)
|Bellator 151
|
|align=center|3
|align=center|5:00
|Thackerville, Oklahoma, United States 
|
|-
|Win
|align=center|6–0
|Eduardo Bustillos
|TKO (punches)
|Bellator 143
|
|align=center|1
|align=center|4:59
|Hidalgo, Texas, United States 
|
|-
|Win
|align=center|5–0
|Kin Moy
|Decision (split)
|Bellator 123
|
|align=center|3
|align=center|5:00
|Uncasville, Connecticut, United States 
|
|-
|Win
|align=center|4–0
|Cody Walker
|KO (punch)
|Bellator 121
|
|align=center|1
|align=center|0:39
|Thackerville, Oklahoma, United States
|
|-
|Win
|align=center|3–0
|Klay Guy
|TKO (punches)
|Triple A MMA 4: Caged Hostility
|
|align=center|2
|align=center|1:14
|Fort Worth, Texas, United States
|
|-
|Win
|align=center|2–0
|Shawn Bunch
|TKO (punches)
|Bellator 105
|
|align=center|3
|align=center|3:29
|Rio Rancho, New Mexico, United States
|
|-
|Win
|align=center|1–0
|Alan Lerma
|TKO (punches)
|Triple A MMA 1: Chavez vs. White
|
|align=center|2
|align=center|1:52
|Albuquerque, New Mexico, United States
|

References

External links 

Living people
1992 births
American male mixed martial artists
Bantamweight mixed martial artists
Mixed martial artists utilizing kickboxing
Mixed martial artists utilizing Brazilian jiu-jitsu
Sportspeople from Albuquerque, New Mexico
Mixed martial artists from New Mexico
Ultimate Fighting Championship male fighters
American practitioners of Brazilian jiu-jitsu